Kathrin Röggla (born 1971) is an Austrian writer, essayist and playwright. She was born in Salzburg, and lives in Berlin since 1992. She has written numerous prose works, including essays, dramas and radio plays. She has won a long range of awards for her literary works. 

In May 2012 she was elected as a member of the Academy of Arts, Berlin. And in November 2015 she got also elected as member of the national Deutsche Akademie für Sprache und Dichtung in Darmstadt.

Röggla is married with the theater director, actor and translator Leopold von Verschuer and mother of a son.

Prizes
 1992: Jahresstipendium des Landes Salzburg für Literatur
 1993: Preis des Internationalen Open-Mike-Festivals Berlin
 1994: Nachwuchsstipendium für Literatur des Bundesministeriums für Unterricht und Kunst
 1995: Meta-Merz-Preis
 1995: Reinhard-Priessnitz-Preis
 1995: Staatsstipendium des Bundesministeriums für Wissenschaft, Forschung und Kunst
 1997/1998: Staatsstipendium für Literatur des Bundeskanzleramtes
 2000: Stipendium Künstlerhaus Edenkoben
 2000: kolik-Literaturpreis
 2000: Alexander-Sacher-Masoch-Preis
 2001: Italo-Svevo-Preis der Hamburger Blue Capital GmbH 
 2001: New York-Stipendium des Deutscher Literaturfonds 
 2004: Förderpreis zum Schiller-Gedächtnispreis und Preis der SWR-Bestenliste
 2005: Internationale Preis für Kunst und Kultur des Kulturfonds der Stadt Salzburg
 2005: Bruno-Kreisky-Preis für das politische Buch
 2005: Solothurner Literaturpreis
 2008: Anton Wildgans Prize
 2010: Nestroy Theatre Prize Bestes Stück – Autorenpreis for worst case
 2010: Franz-Hessel-Preis together with Maylis de Kerangal
 2012: Mainzer Stadtschreiber
 2012: Arthur-Schnitzler-Preis
 2022: Else Lasker-Schüler Dramatist Prize

References

External links

Date of birth missing (living people)
1971 births
Writers from Salzburg
Living people
Austrian women writers
Members of the Academy of Arts, Berlin
Austrian dramatists and playwrights
Austrian essayists